Volga-Sport-Arena is a sports venue in Ulyanovsk, Russia. It is the home of Volga. At the 2016 Bandy World Championship it hosted most of the matches.

Volga-Sport-Arena holds 5,000 seated spectators. The total area of the stadium is 23,000 m2 with an ice of 6,500 m2 or 100x60 m playing field. The decision to build it was taken in 2012 and it opened in 2014.

There is also a local bandy museum at the premises. At the time of the 2016 World Championship held here, plans were announced by Ulyanovsk Oblast Governor Sergey Morozov to make this a national museum for Russian bandy.

External links
 Official site
 Match picture

References

Bandy venues in Russia
Sport in Ulyanovsk